Charlise Mutten, a nine-year-old Australian girl, allegedly disappeared from the Wildenstein Estate wedding venue at Mount Wilson in the Blue Mountains area of New South Wales, Australia on 13 January 2022. Mutten, who lived with her grandmother in Coolangatta, Queensland was visiting her mother, Kallista Mutten, and her mother's fiancé, Justin Stein, at the property, which is owned by Stein's family. The child's body was discovered on 18 January, about 65 km from Mount Wilson. Stein has been charged with her murder.

Family background
Charlise Mutten had lived with her maternal grandmother at Coolangatta since she was five years old. Her parents had split up soon after she was born and she did not have ongoing contact with her father. Her mother Kallista had been jailed for three years after being convicted of dangerous driving occasioning death and driving with an illicit substance in her system. Her mother's fiancé, Justin Stein, was released on parole in November 2020 from a six-and-a-half year sentence for drug possession in 2016. His family owns the Wildenstein Estate. The couple corresponded for the last two years of Kallista's prison sentence, and were engaged soon after her release. They had been engaged for 13 months at the time of Charlise's disappearance.

Disappearance
Mutten was allegedly last seen on the afternoon of 13 January; however, her disappearance was not reported to police until the next day. A wide search by emergency services over five days failed to find her. Neighbours told police they saw a car leaving the resort without headlights at about 4.30 am on 14 January.

Body discovered and murder charge
On 18 January, police discovered the child's body in a barrel near the Colo River, about one hour from Mount Wilson. Stein was arrested at his home in Surry Hills and charged with murder. On 13 January he had tried unsuccessfully to launch a boat at several locations after buying five 20 kg bags of sand. His vehicle was subsequently tracked to Colo River using GPS and CCTV records. The vehicle, a red Holden Colorado ute towing a boat, was sighted at Marsden Park, Drummoyne, Windsor and near the Colo River. A large object in the tray of the ute was no longer present after the ute left the Colo River.

Police allege that Mutten was killed on either 11 or 12 January when she was left alone with Stein while her mother stayed overnight at a caravan park, also owned by Stein's family. Police confirmed that Charlise died from a gunshot wound from a small-calibre firearm.

Stein is being held on remand at Silverwater prison.

In December 2022, police laid additional charges against Stein, alleging he "improperly interfered with a corpse". Stein is also charged with firearms offences, possessing child abuse material and break and enter. He is scheduled to appear in court in February 2023.

Media identification 
The Mutten case has highlighted a New South Wales law which is harsher than every other state. From the time that the accused is charged with a crime involving a child, the child’s name, and any information identifying them, can no longer be reported. This is despite the child's name being widely circulated during the earlier search for her. In Mutten's case, a senior family member had to give the media permission to identify her.

See also
List of solved missing person cases

References

2020s missing person cases
Crime in Australia
Deaths by firearm
Formerly missing people
Incidents of violence against girls
January 2022 crimes in Oceania
Missing person cases in Australia
2022 crimes in Australia
Deaths by firearm in New South Wales